Herbert Whitten (1909–1981) was a Unionist politician in Northern Ireland.

Born in Portadown, Whitten became the managing director of T. A. Shillington, a builders' merchants.  He was elected to Portadown District Council as an Ulster Unionist Party member in 1968, and at the 1969 Northern Ireland general election, he was elected for Central Armagh.

In 1973, following the reorganisation of local government in Northern Ireland, Whitten was elected to Craigavon Borough Council, and he also took a seat in Armagh on the 1973 Northern Ireland Assembly.  He held this seat on the Northern Ireland Constitutional Convention.  In 1978–79, he served as Mayor of Craigavon.

References

1909 births
1981 deaths
Businesspeople from Northern Ireland
Mayors of Craigavon
Members of Craigavon Borough Council
Members of the House of Commons of Northern Ireland 1969–1973
Members of the Northern Ireland Assembly 1973–1974
Members of the Northern Ireland Constitutional Convention
Ulster Unionist Party members of the House of Commons of Northern Ireland
Members of the House of Commons of Northern Ireland for County Armagh constituencies